

The Pape Lighthouse (Latvian: Papes bāka) is a lighthouse located on the Latvian coast of the Baltic Sea.

History
The lighthouse was built in 1910; in a place of a former lighthouse (which existed since 1887); on the southernmost tip of Latvia's coast to the Baltic Sea. During its early existence (up until the end of World War I), the lighthouse was known as a boundary beacon - as the lighthouse guided ships to the port of Liepāja, on the border of the Russian Empire and Prussia. The current lighthouse is a tube-like cylinder, supported by a riveting iron construction. Currently the lighthouse is closed to visitors, although Emilis Melngailis - a famous Latvian composer, stayed overtnight during his folklore expedition.

See also

 List of lighthouses in Latvia

References

Lighthouses completed in 1890
Resort architecture in Latvia
Lighthouses in Latvia